The  is a railway line in Osaka Prefecture, Japan, operated by Hankyu Railway. It commenced operation in 1921 and was completed on March 1, 1967. Through trains operate to and from the Hankyu Kyoto Line and the Osaka Municipal Subway Sakaisuji Line.

History
The Kita-Osaka Electric Railway opened the Awaji - Senriyama section (1435 mm gauge, dual track) electrified at 600 VDC in 1921.

The Senri line was nicknamed the "Graveyard Train" as the northern terminus around Senriyama was once the site of numerous graveyards.

The Shin-Keihan Railway took the control of the railway in 1923. The Awaji - Tenjimbashi (present-day Tenjimbashisuji Rokuchōme) section opened in 1925 (1435 mm gauge, dual track), electrified at 600 VDC, and in 1928 the voltage was increased to 1500 VDC. With the terminal at Tenjimbashi, this section was a part of the main line of the Shin-Keihan Railway (later the Shin-Keihan Line of the Keihan Electric Railway) connecting Kyoto and Osaka. 

The Senriyama - Shin-Senriyama (now Minami-Senri) section opened in 1963, and was extended to Kita-Senri in 1967 (both dual track and electrified). These extensions were to serve the newly developed Senri New Town. 

After the Shinkeihan lines were merged to Hankyu in 1943, the role of Tenjimbashi Station as the terminal was gradually shifted to Umeda, the terminal built by Hankyu, and ended in 1969 when the through-running from Tenjimbashisuji Rokuchōme (replacing the old terminal with a single underground platform) to the Osaka Subway Sakaisuji Line commenced. In 1970, the line was one of major access routes to Expo '70 with the temporary Expo West Gate Station.

Construction has been in progress since 2012 to elevate a  section of track from Kunijima Station to Shimo-Shinjō Station including the junction with the Kyoto Line at Awaji Station. Originally projected for a 2020 completion, various delays have pushed back the start of operations on the new tracks to 2031.

As of 2013, all stations on the line are assigned station numbers.

The Senri line celebrated its 100th year of operation on 21 April 2021.

Service types
In the timetable revised on December 21, 2013, regular trains are classified in three types:

 - in spring and autumn

Stations

Abandoned stations
Nagara (Tenjimbashisuji Rokuchome - Kunijima) - abandoned on February 1, 1944
Suita (first) (Shimo-Shinjo - Shiyakusho-mae) - consolidated to Shiyakisho-mae Station on April 10, 1964 and Shiyakusho-mae Station was renamed Suita Station.
Kadancho (Toyotsu - Daigaku-mae) - consolidated to Kandai-mae Station on April 10, 1964
Daigaku-mae (Kadancho - Senriyama) - consolidated to Kandai-mae Station on April 10, 1964
Expo West Gate (Minami-Senri - Kita-Senri) - used from November 10, 1969 until September 14, 1970

References
This article incorporates material from the corresponding article in the Japanese Wikipedia

Senri Line
Senri Line
Railway lines opened in 1967